is a Japanese women's professional shogi player ranked 1-dan.

Promotion history
Mizumachi's promotion history is as follows:

 2-kyū: May 1, 2018
 1-kyū: January 18, 2019
 1-dan: April 1, 2020

Note: All ranks are women's professional ranks.

References

External links
 ShogiHub: Mizumachi, Miyu

2001 births
Living people
Japanese shogi players
Women's professional shogi players
People from Fukuoka
Professional shogi players from Fukuoka Prefecture